
Gmina Pogorzela is an urban-rural gmina (administrative district) in Gostyń County, Greater Poland Voivodeship, in west-central Poland.

Villages
Apart from the town of Pogorzela, Gmina Pogorzela contains the villages and settlements of Bielawy Pogorzelskie, Bułaków, Dobrapomoc, Elżbietków, Głuchów, Głuchówek, Gumienice, Józefów Ochelski, Kaczagórka, Kromolice, Łukaszew, Małgów, Międzyborze, Nowiny, Ochla, Paradów, Stawy, Taczanówko and Wziąchów.

Neighbouring gminas
Gmina Pogorzela is bordered by the gminas of Borek Wielkopolski, Kobylin, Koźmin Wielkopolski, Krotoszyn, Pępowo and Piaski.

References
Polish official population figures 2006

Pogorzela
Gostyń County